Ormosia amazonica is a species of tree in the family Fabaceae native to the Amazon rainforest. It is naturally distributed in Brazil, Bolivia, Colombia, Costa Rica, Ecuador and Peru, in the Amazon Forest in Igarapó Forests. The species was first described by the Brazilian botanist of Austro-Hungarian origin Adolpho Ducke in 1922.

Notes 
 This article was partially translated from the Portuguese version of Wikipedia, whose title is Ormosia amazonica.

References 

Flora of the Amazon
Flora of Peru
Flora of Ecuador
Flora of Costa Rica
Flora of Colombia
Flora of Brazil
Flora of Bolivia
Plants described in 1922
amazonica
Taxa named by Adolpho Ducke